Robin Stone (born April 27, 1962) is an American  singer and songwriter, who scored success in the 1990s with such house music singles as "Show Me Love" (which was her debut single) and "Luv 4 Luv". She has had three number ones on the Billboard Hot Dance Club Play chart.

Biography 
Robin Stone released the original version of the single "Show Me Love" in 1990. The track was produced by Fred McFarlane and went on to become a moderate success. In 1993, the track was remixed by the Swedish DJ and producer StoneBridge and re-released under the artist name "Robin S." with Big Beat Records in 1993. This release climbed the charts the same year, as did her first album, also titled Show Me Love. The remixed version of "Show Me Love" peaked at No. 1 on the Hot Dance Music/Club Play, No. 1 on the Hot Dance Singles Sales, No. 7 on the Hot R&B/Hip-Hop Singles and Tracks and No. 5 on the Billboard Hot 100. It also peaked at No. 4 on the Rhythmic Top 40 chart. The success earned her a spot on the 1994 "American Music Awards" as a performer. The follow-up singles, "Luv 4 Luv" and "What I Do Best", saw similar success. As of 2004, the album Show Me Love had sold 303,000 copies in the US.

After taking time off to work on her songwriting, she began working with producers Eric "E-Smoove" Miller and Todd Terry on her second album. Released in 1997 on Atlantic Records, From Now On reflected broader interests for Robin S., encompassing Gospel and R&B ballads in addition to Hi-NRG dance-floor material. The album's first single, "It Must Be Love", became a hit, spending two weeks at No. 1 on the Hot Dance Club Play chart. It was also a moderate crossover hit on the Hot R&B/Hip-Hop Songs chart, peaking at No. 35, and a minor pop hit, peaking at No. 91 on the Billboard Hot 100. The follow-up single "Midnight" reached No. 1 on the Hot Dance Club Play, and got better success on the Billboard Top 100, peaking at No. 35. Robin S. performed the hit on the Ricki Lake show during the week the single hit Top 10 on the U.S. dance charts. She also appeared on the RuPaul show to promote From Now On; the album sold about 100,000 copies in the U.S. by the end of its album's chart run. "Midnight" was written by British singer Alison Moyet and it appears on the first Yazoo album, Upstairs at Eric's. In 1996 she did a song, "Givin You All That I Got", that was played in the movie Space Jam and was featured on the soundtrack.

Robin S. completed a successful European tour in 2004, where her music has historically found a larger audience. She has become a popular performer at 1990s-themed club/dance-pop concerts. As of early 2007, Robin S. was still recording though none of her new material has been released as she is seeking a new record label. Robin S. continued to perform on cruise liners in Europe and Asia.

In 2008, she recorded a new song with the European artist Honest. In October 2008, the radio mix of her 1993 song "Show Me Love" reached the top of the Dutch Top 40. That made it Robin S.'s most successful song in the Netherlands. In 2009, she recorded new song with Corey Gibbons, the single "At My Best".

In 2016, Robin S.'s collaboration with DJ Escape on the track, "Shout It Loud", went to number one on the US dance chart.

Discography

Studio albums

Singles

See also
 List of Billboard number-one dance club songs
 List of artists who reached number one on the U.S. Dance Club Songs chart

References

External links
 

1962 births
Living people
African-American women singer-songwriters
American contemporary R&B singers
American gospel singers
American house musicians
Atlantic Records artists
Big Beat Records (American record label) artists
People from Queens, New York
Singer-songwriters from New York (state)
American women in electronic music
20th-century African-American women singers
21st-century African-American women singers